The Ghost Inside, formerly known as A Dying Dream, is an American metalcore band from Los Angeles, California, formed in 2004. The band currently consists of vocalist Jonathan Vigil, guitarists Zach Johnson and Chris Davis, bassist Jim Riley and drummer Andrew Tkaczyk. They have released one EP and five studio albums, with their latest, The Ghost Inside, released on June 5, 2020 via Epitaph Records as a return from their hiatus.

History

Early years (2004–2009)
As A Dying Dream, they released an EP, Now or Never on Frontline Records. A year later, they signed to Mediaskare Records, where they re-recorded and re-released the EP with an additional track and bonus live footage. The release contained early versions of their debut album that followed. Not long after, they changed their name to the Ghost Inside, and released a full-length studio album entitled Fury and the Fallen Ones.

Returners (2010–2012)

Their second album, titled Returners, was released on June 8, 2010 via Mediaskare Records.

On February 24, 2011, it was announced that KC Stockbridge and the Ghost Inside mutually parted ways and that Andrew Tkaczyk, formerly the drummer and main songwriter in For the Fallen Dreams, had been filling in on drums. As of January 10, 2012, the band has been signed to Epitaph Records.

In 2012, the band headlined the Alternative Press Tour along with Miss May I.

Get What You Give (2012–2013)

Their first release for Epitaph Records Get What You Give, which was produced by A Day to Remember's vocalist Jeremy McKinnon was released on June 19, 2012 and debuted at No. 88 on the Billboard 200. The band toured the world in support of the album in 2013.

Dear Youth (2014–2015)

On September 8, 2014, the band released a new song "Avalanche". And on September 16, 2014 Spotify leaked details of their new album Dear Youth, which was later released on November 17, 2014 via Epitaph Records and debuted at No 63. on the Billboard 200.

On January 9, 2015, the Ghost Inside posted on their Facebook page that they are parting ways with founding member and lead guitarist Aaron Brooks, leaving Jonathan Vigil as the last original member in the current lineup.

Bus crash and hiatus (2015–2018)

On the morning of November 19, 2015, the band's tour bus collided head on with a tractor trailer while headed west to Mesa, Arizona on U.S. Highway 180, eight miles east of the border patrol checkpoint outside of El Paso, Texas. The drivers of both vehicles died, while the remaining ten people on the bus survived. Jonathan Vigil, Zach Johnson, Andrew Tkaczyk and two others were hospitalized in critical condition. On January 13, 2016, Vigil posted his first update via Instagram since the accident, where he stated his injuries and his gratefulness "to be alive". The next day, Tkaczyk confirmed via his Instagram account that the accident had resulted in him losing one of his legs following an initial ten-day coma.

On March 22, 2016, during the livestream of the Warped Tour band announcement of that year, it was announced that the Ghost Inside would play Warped Tour 2017. An announcement that far in advance was unprecedented. They were the first band announced for the tour. On March 23, 2016, Chris Davis, formerly of Texas in July, was announced as an official member after touring with the band since 2015. On February 10, 2017, Vigil announced that the band would be unable to perform on Warped Tour 2017. Warped Tour announced they would continue to hold their spot for the band until they were well enough to play, even though the Warped Tour's full cross-country format was retired the following year.

On April 17, 2018, the band held their first practice since the accident. On April 30, 2018, the band confirmed and assured their fans with a statement in which they said "Yes, there is a future."

Return and The Ghost Inside (2019–present)
On January 21, 2019, the band shared a photo of them in studio on Twitter after a fan asked if they were working on new music, indicating they had something in the works in front of them. On February 22, they announced a return show for July 13, 2019, at The Shrine in Los Angeles.

The show at The Shrine sold out in 4 minutes according to vocalist Jonathan Vigil. The show successfully took place on July 13, outside the venue with a festival-style stage rather than in the expo hall itself. During the show, Vigil said he was not sure if that would be the Ghost Inside's last show ever or if they would play "a hundred more," but he did announce that the band was working on new music.

In a video update on August 27, 2019, the band stated that they plan to perform some one-off shows at some point in 2020 but stressed that they are "not going on tour."

On January 11, 2020, the band played their second comeback show at UNIFY Gathering in Australia where they alluded they would come back to Australia in 2021, but nothing was confirmed yet.

On April 22, 2020 the band released a new single, "Aftermath", and announced their self titled album set for release on June 5, 2020.

On June 6, 2020, the Ghost Inside announced they had parted ways with longtime bassist Jim Riley following an alleged racial comment made by Riley in 2015, which Jim had opened up about the day before. In an interview that September, however, the band reflected that this was the "wrong call" and regretted firing Riley. By November 2020, Riley had been reinstated per the band's official Instagram page.

In 2021, as the COVID-19 pandemic began to lessen, the band returned to the stage once again in Worcester, Massachusetts on August 28. This would be the first time any of the songs off their self-titled record would be performed. They also planned to perform at the Blue Ridge Rock Festival in Virginia and Riot Fest in Chicago following their date at the Palladium. The band is due to return to So What?! Music Festival in Dallas, TX on Memorial Day Weekend 2022  and then the UK and Europe for shows in the Summer of 2022.

Musical style, influences and songwriting
The Ghost Inside's music has been classified as metalcore and "melodic, emotional hardcore". They have self-identified as melodic hardcore, for example on their Facebook page. However, former bassist and backing vocalist Jim Riley stated in a 2013 interview that "to [him] the band is a metalcore band" and that they're "similar to Unearth or As I Lay Dying or something like that, with a little bit less guitar solos and a little bit less singing". He said that they are influenced by "an older generation of bands" such as Throwdown, Bury Your Dead (especially Beauty and the Breakdown), Misery Signals, Killswitch Engage, Unearth (especially The Oncoming Storm) and Bleeding Through, some of which he considers "seminal to what metalcore is", as well as modern music that isn't necessarily heavy (such as pop punk), and that he himself listens "to a lot of emo". In a 2009 interview, vocalist Jonathan Vigil stated that he grew up listening to punk rock bands such as NOFX and Less Than Jake before getting into heavier bands such as Hatebreed and Slipknot, while guitarist Aaron Brooks said that he listened to bands like Bad Religion before getting into Poison the Well, that one of his favorite bands currently are Comeback Kid and that he also appreciates Hatebreed. This musical background was further confirmed when Zach Johnson listed NOFX's Punk in Drublic, Strung Out's Suburban Teenage Wasteland Blues and AFI's Black Sails in the Sunset as his favorite three albums.

Riley stated that when writing a song, the band usually puts the instrumentation together first, before vocalist Jonathan Vigil and guitarist Aaron Brooks write lyrics for it. He also noted that the decision to use clean vocals in some songs of Get What You Give, such as "Engine 45", came from the band and wasn't forced by producer Jeremy McKinnon.

Members

Current
 Jonathan Vigil – lead vocals (2004–present)
 Zach Johnson – lead guitar, backing vocals (2015–present), rhythm guitar (2008–2016)
 Andrew Tkaczyk – drums, percussion (2011–present)
 Chris Davis – rhythm guitar (2016–present; touring musician 2015–2016)
 Jim Riley – bass, backing vocals (2009–2020, 2020-present)

Former
 Ryan Romero – rhythm guitar (2004–2006)
 Josh Navarro – rhythm & lead guitar (2004–2006)
 Anthony Rivera – drums (2004–2006)
 Tyler Watamanuk – bass (2004–2008)
 Soyer Cole – rhythm guitar (2006–2008)
 Garrett Harer – bass (2008–2009)
 KC Stockbridge – drums, percussion  (2006–2011)
 Aaron Brooks – lead guitar, backing vocals (2004–2015)

Timeline

Discography

Studio albums

Live albums

EPs

References

External links
 

2004 establishments in California
Metalcore musical groups from California
Epitaph Records artists
Hardcore punk groups from California
Heavy metal musical groups from California
Melodic hardcore musical groups from California
Musical groups established in 2004
Musical groups from Los Angeles
Musical quintets